is an underground metro station located in Tempaku-ku, Nagoya, Aichi Prefecture, Japan operated by the Nagoya Municipal Subway's Tsurumai Line. It is located 19.3 rail kilometers from the terminus of the Tsurumai Line at Kami-Otai Station. Near this station is the Aichi Driver's License Examination Center.

History
Hirabari Station was opened on 1 October 1978.

Lines

 (Station number: T19)

Layout
Hirabari Station has two underground opposed side platforms. The platforms are as follows:

Platforms

Surroundings
Mitsubishi UFJ Bank Hirabari Branch

References

External links

 Hirabari Station official web site 

Railway stations in Japan opened in 1978
Railway stations in Aichi Prefecture